Chase Claypool (born July 7, 1998) is a Canadian professional American football wide receiver for the Chicago Bears of the National Football League (NFL). He played college football at Notre Dame and was drafted by the Pittsburgh Steelers in the second round of the 2020 NFL Draft.

Early years
Claypool attended Abbotsford Senior Secondary School in Abbotsford, British Columbia, Canada where he played both basketball and AA football in his senior years and graduated in 2016.
During his career, he set numerous school receiving records. After receiving recruitment offers from several top-tier US colleges, Claypool decided to commit to the University of Notre Dame to play college football.

College career
Claypool played in 12 games as a true freshman at Notre Dame in 2016. He finished the season with five receptions for 81 yards and led the team in special teams tackles with 11. As a sophomore in 2017, he started eight of 12 games, recording 29 receptions for 402 yards and two touchdowns. As a junior in 2018, Claypool started 12 of 13 games, finishing second on the team with 50 receptions for 639 yards and four touchdowns. Claypool took over as Notre Dame's number one receiver his senior year in 2019, a season in which he caught 66 passes for 1,037 yards and 13 touchdowns.

College statistics

Professional career

Pittsburgh Steelers
Claypool was selected by the Pittsburgh Steelers in the second round, 49th overall, in the 2020 NFL Draft as the team's first selection. Although eligible as a Canadian and rated as the No. 2 prospect, Claypool went undrafted in the 2020 CFL Draft.

On July 22, 2020, Claypool signed a rookie contract with the Steelers worth $6.6 million over four years.

On September 20, during Week 2 against the Denver Broncos, Claypool finished with three receptions for 88 receiving yards, including an 84-yard touchdown, as the Steelers won 26–21.

In Week 5, against the Philadelphia Eagles, Claypool finished with 110 receiving yards and four total touchdowns (three receiving & one rushing), both career highs, as the Steelers won 38–29. With his Week 5 effort, Claypool became the first Steelers rookie in franchise history to score four touchdowns in a game, and the first Steeler since Roy Jefferson in 1968 to do so. Claypool also became the only wide receiver in NFL history to accomplish this feat in the same game. His performance helped the team start out with a 4–0 record for the first time since 1979. On October 14, 2020, Claypool was named the AFC Offensive Player of the Week for his performance in Week 5.

In Week 10, against the Cincinnati Bengals, he had four receptions for 56 receiving yards and two receiving touchdowns in 36–10 victory.

In the Wild Card round of the playoffs against the Cleveland Browns, Claypool recorded 5 catches for 59 yards and two touchdowns during the 48–37 loss.

Chicago Bears
Claypool was traded to the Chicago Bears on November 1, 2022, in exchange for their second round pick in the 2023 NFL Draft. In his Bears debut in Week 9 vs. the Miami Dolphins, Claypool caught 2 passes for 13 yards.

NFL career statistics

Regular season

Postseason

Personal life
Claypool has a YouTube channel and is active in posting to his numerous social media accounts.

References

External links
Pittsburgh Steelers bio
Notre Dame Fighting Irish bio

1998 births
Living people
American football wide receivers
Chicago Bears players
Canadian expatriate American football people in the United States
Notre Dame Fighting Irish football players
Pittsburgh Steelers players
Sportspeople from Abbotsford, British Columbia
Black Canadian players of American football